"Desafiando el Destino" (English: "Defying Fate"; stylised in all caps) is a song by Argentine singer-songwriter María Becerra. It was written by Becerra and Nico Cotton and produced by the latter. The song was released on 12 January 2022 as the fourth single from her second studio album, La Nena de Argentina.

Background

"Desafiando el Destino" was first teased on November 2022 along with other songs from the album on TikTok by Becerra, but the track was nowhere to appear on the album release. The singer later revealed in an interview with Perfil that the song would be released as a bonus track, stating: “We knew that it was a song that would caught the attention of many and they were gonna enjoy it a lot. It’s a very emotional song and video, I wrote it for my parents, so it’s also to maintain the hype for the song.” "I wrote this ballad for my parents. It’s a letter where I express my desire to rebel against destiny when it comes to the people I love. Against the natural order, the cycle of life, the march of time." The song was officially announced on 6 January 2023 on Becerra’s social media counts, with a clip of the music video. The song was released on 12 January 2023.

Music and lyrics

In contrast to Becerra’s usual use of trap and reggaetón on her songs, "Desafiando el Destino" is a ballad. The song also features a gospel choir in the background.

Lyrically, the song is about Becerra and her parents Pedro and Irene, whom she is apologizing for not showing an amount of importance. She sings on how she’ll go against fate and everything else to show how much she loves them.

Critical reception

Leila Cobo from Billboard praised the song, stating: "María Becerra shows a […] more powerful side in her soulful "Desafiando el destino". […] the song begins with a slow, piano introduction, which introduces Becerra's voice tinged with melancholy. Touches of a gospel choir tastefully inserted into the simple arrangement add more drama to this beautiful song. Becerra should explore the idea of making more of this material."

Rolling Stone critic Tomás Mier said: "Songs like "Perreo Furioso" and "Mandamientos" tap into the trap-reggaetón Becerra has done throughout her career, but on ballads like "Desafiando el Destino" dedicated to her parents […] she shows off her specific, yet relatable lyricism."

Commercial performance 
In Argentina, the song debuted at number 67 on the Billboard Argentina Hot 100 during the tracking week of 21 January 2023.

Music video

The music video for "Desafiando el Destino" was directed by Julián Levy and was released simultaneously with the song. 

The music video features clips from Becerra’s childhood in which her parents and siblings appear.

Charts

References

2023 singles
2023 songs
María Becerra songs
Spanish-language songs